Celestine Richards McConville is an American attorney who is a law professor at the Dale E. Fowler School of Law of Chapman University in Orange, California. Her research interests include constitutional and death penalty law.

Biography
McConville grew up in Rocky River, Ohio. She studied at Boston University, where she received a B.A. magna cum laude in 1988. She attended the Georgetown University School of Law, serving as an editor of the Georgetown Law Journal, graduating Order of the Coif and magna cum laude with a J.D. in 1991. After law school, she was law clerk for Judge Cynthia Holcomb Hall of the United States Court of Appeals for the Ninth Circuit, Judge Donald C. Nugent on the United States District Court for the Northern District of Ohio, and finally for Chief Justice of the United States Supreme Court William H. Rehnquist in 1992–1993. Following her clerkships, she practiced law for three years as an associate at Shea & Gardner in Washington, D.C., where she worked on litigation.

In 1999, McConville was a visiting professor at Case Western Reserve University School of Law. In 2000, McConville joined the faculty of Chapman University as an associate professor of law, where she teaches constitutional law. In 2005, she was promoted to professor of law. From June 2007 to May 2009, she served as associate dean for administrative affairs.

Personal life

She is married to Thomas S. McConville, her law school classmate, who is a Superior Court judge in Orange County, California. They have two sons.

Select articles
 
 
 
 
  (Hein paid access)

See also 
 List of law clerks of the Supreme Court of the United States (Chief Justice)

References

External links
 Bio, Chapman University
 Columns, at Justia.com

Year of birth missing (living people)
1960s births
Living people
People from Rocky River, Ohio
People from Orange, California
20th-century American lawyers
21st-century American lawyers
Boston University alumni
Georgetown University Law Center alumni
Chapman University faculty
Case Western Reserve University faculty
Law clerks of the Supreme Court of the United States
American legal scholars
American scholars of constitutional law
American women academics
American women non-fiction writers
21st-century American women